The 2020 FIS Ski Jumping Grand Prix was the 27th Summer Grand Prix season in ski jumping for men and the 9th for ladies. On July 31, the International Ski Federation announced the decision that due to the cancellation of most competitions in the series, no prize will be awarded to the winner of the general classification.

Other competitive circuits this season included the World Cup, Continental Cup, FIS Cup, FIS Race and Alpen Cup.

Calendar

Men

Ladies

References 

Grand Prix
FIS Grand Prix Ski Jumping